Kuji Station is the name of two train stations in Japan.

 Kuji Station (Iwate) - (久慈駅) in Kuji, Iwate Prefecture
 Kuji Station (Kanagawa) - (久地駅) in Kawasaki, Kanagawa Prefecture